Michael López Medina (born 2 April 1989) is a Chilean footballer who plays as a forward. He is currently a free agent.

Career
López's career started with a brief stint with Trasandino in 2012. Later that year, he joined Primera División de Chile side Unión San Felipe. He first appeared for the B team in the Segunda División de Chile, scoring two goals in twelve appearances throughout the season. He then made his professional first-team debut on 15 September 2012 in a Primera División home win against Deportes La Serena. He was sent off in his third appearance versus Deportes Iquique. He went onto play seven times in the following season, 2013, in Primera B de Chile before departing the club.

He joined Segunda División team Deportes Melipilla ahead of the 2013–14 season, making his first bow in September 2013 against Colo-Colo B. He left at the end of the season after making eighteen appearances. In the next two Primera B seasons, López joined Lota Schwager in 2014 and Coquimbo Unido in 2015. A total of sixteen appearances came in total for Lota and Coquimbo. In August 2017, López joined third tier Deportes Vallenar. His debut for Deportes Vallenar came against Deportes Pintana in early September. He left a year after joining.

On 30 June 2017, López rejoined former club Deportes Melipilla. He departed at the end of 2017 after only one appearance, versus Deportes Naval on 8 December.

Career statistics
.

References

External links

1989 births
Living people
People from Santiago Province, Chile
Chilean footballers
Association football forwards
Tercera División de Chile players
Segunda División Profesional de Chile players
Chilean Primera División players
Primera B de Chile players
Trasandino footballers
Unión San Felipe footballers
Deportes Melipilla footballers
Lota Schwager footballers
Coquimbo Unido footballers
Deportes Vallenar footballers